East Coast may refer to:

Entertainment
 East Coast hip hop, a subgenre of hip hop
 "East Coast" (ASAP Ferg song), 2017
 "East Coast" (Saves the Day song), 2004
 East Coast FM, a radio station in Co. Wicklow, Ireland
 East Coast Swing, a form of social partner dance

Places
 East Coast of the United States
 East Coast (New Zealand electorate)
 Atlantic Canada, New Brunswick, Prince Edward Island, Nova Scotia, and Newfoundland and Labrador
 Eastern Canada (by extension of the above)
 Australian south-east coast drainage division, an area of southern Australia
 Eastern states of Australia
 East Region, Singapore
 Gisborne District, area of New Zealand referred to as the East Coast
 Levante, Spain, eastern region of the Iberian Peninsula
 Eastern part of coastal India
Coromandel Coast, southeastern India
Eastern Coastal Plains
 East Coast of Peninsular Malaysia

Transportation
 East Coast (train operating company), a former train company in the UK
 East Coast Buses, a subsidiary of Lothian Buses in Scotland
 East Coast Greenway, biking and walking route in U.S.
 East Coast Main Line, English railway link
 East Coast Parkway, an expressway on the southeastern coast of Singapore
 East Coast Railway Zone (India), one of the sixteen railway zones of Indian Railways
 Florida East Coast Railway, a Class II railroad operating in the US state of Florida
 Lumo (train operating company), train company in the United Kingdom formerly known as East Coast Trains
 New Brunswick East Coast Railway, a historic Canadian railway that operated in New Brunswick

Other
 East coast akalat, a small passerine bird
 East Coast bias, when American East Coast sports teams are given undue weight by broadcasters
 East Coast Borough Council, proposed name for Ards and North Down Borough Council, Northern Ireland, UK